Vijay Krishnaraj, also known as R Krishnan, is an Indian actor, writer, director, who is working in Tamil Films and Television industry. He made his debut in Tamil cinema as story writer and dialogue writer of Rosappu Ravikkaikari film in 1979. He made his acting debut in the Tamil film Rajathi Rojakili along with Sulakshana, directed by S. Devarajan. He has acted over 100 films.

Film career 
He was born in Tiruchengode, Namakkal Dist, Tamil Nadu. He started his career as story writer in the film Rosappu Ravikkaikari. His notable movie for his story and dialogue such as Rosappu Ravikkaikari, Kalthoon and Ranuva Veeran. Later, he has acted as supporting role in Rajathi Rojakili in 1985. He has written screenplay six films for Veteran Telugu film director Ragavendara Rao. His some well known films such Aavathum Pennale Azhivathum Pennale, Kaalaiyum Neeye Maalaiyum Neeye, Poonthotta Kaavalkaaran, Sandhana Kaatru, Vaanmathi, Vaimaye Vellum. His performances in many films were lauded especially in Annan Ennada Thambi Ennada.

Television career 
In the early 2000s gradually he moved to act in television series in Tamil. Currently, he is doing many Tamil serials. His Tamil serials list are below:

Filmography 
As actor

As story and dialogue writer

As director

As dubbing artist

References

External links 

Living people
Tamil male actors
Tamil male television actors
Television personalities from Tamil Nadu
Male actors from Tamil Nadu
Male actors in Tamil cinema
Year of birth missing (living people)